Senator Gibson may refer to:

Members of the Northern Irish Senate
William Gibson (Ulster Unionist Party politician) (1859/1860–?), Northern Irish Senator from 1935 to 1942

Members of the United States Senate
Charles Hopper Gibson (1842–1900), U.S. Senator from Maryland from 1891 to 1897
Ernest W. Gibson Jr. (1901–1969), U.S. Senator from Vermont from 1940 to 1941
Ernest Willard Gibson (1872–1940), U.S. Senator from Vermont from 1933 to 1940
Paris Gibson (1830–1920), U.S. Senator from Montana from 1901 to 1905
Randall L. Gibson (1832–1892), U.S. Senator from Louisiana from 1883 to 1892

United States state senate members
Audrey Gibson (born 1956), Florida State Senate
Ben Gibson (politician) (1882–1949), Iowa State Senate
Carroll Gibson (born 1945), Kentucky State Senate
Floyd Robert Gibson (1910–2001), Missouri State Senate
Henry R. Gibson (1837–1938), Tennessee State Senate
James Gibson (New York state senator) (1816–1897), New York State Senate
Thomas K. Gibson (1811–1900), Wisconsin State Senate